
US Cyber Challenge is a private program which recruits, trains, and places candidates in cybersecurity jobs in the United States. US Cyber Challenge was formerly a DHS S&T-funded not-for-profit organization, and is currently a program of the Center for Internet Security.

History 
The founding director of US Cyber Challenge was Karen S. Evans.

Methodology 
The US Cyber Challenge uses an online competition each April to select qualified candidates for a one-week cybersecurity training program the following summer. The summer program includes workshops, a job fair, and a capture the flag competition. Topics covered in the workshops include intrusion detection, penetration testing and forensics. Participation is limited to high school and college students who are US citizens.

References

External Links 
 Official web site
 

2010 establishments in the United States
Computer security
Recurring events established in 2010